Karachi, Pakistan was a federation of eighteen autonomous boroughs, called "Towns," that made up the City District of Karachi from 2001 until 2011. Under this now-defunct system, Karachi had a local government system, with a mayor empowered to make decisions in regards to city-planning and administration of local services. The system was abolished in 2011, and Karachi was divided into 5 City District Municipal Corporations, with a 6th formed in 2013. Each Municipal Corporation now has its own Chairman and Deputy Chairman. The Karachi Development Authority, which controls city-planning and administration of services in Karachi, is no longer controlled at the local level, but is instead administered by the province directly.

History 
The history of the administration of Karachi begins in 1846, when a cholera epidemic threatened the 9,000 citizens of the city. The efforts to combat this infectious disease were coordinated by a Conservancy Board. In 1852, the Conservancy Board became a Municipal Commission and in 1853, it was upgraded to Municipal Committee. In 1878, the city was empowered to collect taxes at a local level.

The City of Karachi Municipal Act was promulgated in 1933, and the Municipal Committee became a multi-ethnic 57-member Municipal Corporation with a President and a Vice-President in place of the former Mayor and Deputy Mayor. The first President was Jamshed Naserwanji, who had previously served as Mayor for twenty years.

After independence in 1947, Karachi became the capital of the newly independent state of Pakistan and Mayor Hakim Ehsan received the Governor-General, Muhammad Ali Jinnah, at Karachi International Airport. 1948 saw the city boundaries fixed within the new Federal Capital Territory, which covered 2,103 km² but also included several small towns and villages separate from Karachi.

During the period from 1961-1970 the former Federal Capital Territory was merged with the neighbouring princely state of Las Bela to form the Karachi-Bela Division of West Pakistan. During the 1970s this merger was reversed and Karachi became a division in its own right, covering 3,528 km².

The Karachi Municipal Corporation was upgraded to a Metropolitan Corporation in 1976, followed by Zonal Municipal Committees operating from 1987-1994. The system of government changed again in 1996, when the Division of Karachi was subdivided into five districts, each with its own Municipal Corporation.

In 1999, President Pervez Musharraf committed itself to an overhaul of the entire administrative structure of the country. In the year 2000, the entire third tier of government (administrative divisions) was abolished in favour of the fourth tier (districts). In Karachi, the division of Karachi and the five districts were merged to form a new City-District which was subdivided in August 2001 into eighteen autonomous towns comprising 178 local union councils.

The town system was abolished in 2011, and the Karachi Development Authority is run at the provincial, rather than local, level.

Karachi Towns 
Each of the eighteen towns were governed by an elected Town Council, and led by an elected Town Nazim (Mayor) assisted by a number of officials.

 Baldia Town
 Bin Qasim Town
 Gadap Town
 Gulberg Town
 Gulshan Town
 Jamshed Town
 Kiamari Town
 Korangi Town
 Landhi Town

 Liaquatabad Town
 Lyari Town
 Malir Town
 New Karachi Town
 North Nazimabad Town
 Orangi Town
 Saddar Town
 Shah Faisal Town
 SITE Town

See also 
 City District Government
 Karachi
 Lahore

References 

  World Gazetteer data

External links 
 Karachi Website